The Ksani (Ĉysandon) is a river in central Georgia, which rises on the southern slopes of the Greater Caucasus Mountain Range in South Ossetia and flows into the Kura (Mtkvari). Ksani (both the river and the name) is often associated with the Medieval Georgian Ksani fortress which lies near the confluence of the Ksani and the Mtkvari.

See also 
Duchy of Ksani

References 

Rivers of Georgia (country)
Rivers of South Ossetia
Akhalgori District
Geography of Mtskheta-Mtianeti